The Round Ireland Yacht Race is Ireland’s premier offshore yacht race and is held every two years by Wicklow Sailing Club in association with the Royal Irish Yacht Club and Royal Ocean Racing Club. 
The 704 nautical mile race was first held in 1980 and still retains the original course; “leave Ireland and all its islands excluding Rockall to starboard.” 
The latest edition of the race took place on 18th June 2022.

History
The concept of a race around Ireland began in 1975 with a double-handed race starting and finishing in Bangor organized by Ballyholme Yacht Club with stopovers in Crosshaven and Killybegs. 
That race only had four entries. In 1980 Michael Jones put forward the idea of a non-stop race and was held in that year from Wicklow Sailing Club. 
Sixteen pioneers entered that race with Brian Coad’s Raasay of Melfort returning home after six days at sea to win the inaugural race.

Records
The outright Round Ireland race record of 38 h 37 min 7 s is held by MOD-70 trimaran Musandam-Oman Sail and was set in June 2016.

The monohull Round Ireland race record of 50 h 24 min and 9 s is held by George David's Rambler 88 from Newport, RI, USA was also set in the 2016 race.

The previous record (65 h 48 min 47 s) was held by Mike Slade’s ICAP Leopard set in 2008, a race dominated by gale-force winds, the 100 foot super maxi knocked over 10 hours off the previous race record, set in 1998 by Colm Barrington's Jeep Cherokee.

In a close fought race for line honours in the 2016 race, Musandam-Oman Sail finished just minutes before Ned Collier-Wakefield's Concise-10 and Lloyd Thornburg's Phaedo-3. All three boats broke the previous record of 40 h 51 min 57 s also set by Musandam-Oman Sail in 2015
, which had replaced the long-standing 1993 record of 44 h 42 min 20 s set by Steve Fossett's 60 foot trimaran Lakota. (Both of which were set in scheduled (i.e. non-race) attempts)

Winners

References

External links
 Round Ireland Race Homepage

Biennial sporting events
Recurring sporting events established in 1980
Yachting races